Richard Wilson  (1 August 1714 – 15 May 1782) was an influential Welsh landscape painter, who worked in Britain and Italy. With George Lambert he is recognised as a pioneer in British art of landscape for its own sake and was described in the Welsh Academy Encyclopedia of Wales as the "most distinguished painter Wales has ever produced and the first to appreciate the aesthetic possibilities of his country". In December 1768 Wilson became one of the founder-members of the Royal Academy. A catalogue raisonné of the artist's work compiled by Paul Spencer-Longhurst is published by the Paul Mellon Centre for Studies in British Art.

Life
The son of a clergyman, Richard Wilson was born on 1 August 1714, in the village of Penegoes in Montgomeryshire (now Powys). The family was an established one, and Wilson was first cousin to Charles Pratt, 1st Earl Camden. In 1729 he went to London, where he began as a portrait painter, under the apprenticeship of an obscure artist, Thomas Wright. Wilson could often be found walking around Marylebone Gardens with his acquaintance Baretti heading toward the Farthing Pie House, now known as the Greene Man.

From 1750 to 1757 Wilson was in Italy, and became a landscape painter on the advice of Francesco Zuccarelli. Painting in Italy and afterwards in Britain, he was the first major British painter to concentrate on landscape. He composed well, but saw and rendered only the general effects of nature, thereby creating a personal, ideal style influenced by Claude Lorrain and the Dutch landscape tradition. John Ruskin wrote that Wilson "paints in a manly way, and occasionally reaches exquisite tones of colour". He concentrated on painting idealised Italianate landscapes and landscapes based upon classical literature, but when his painting, The Destruction of the Children of Niobe (c.1759–60), won acclaim, he gained many commissions from landowners seeking classical portrayals of their estates. 
Among Wilson's pupils was the painter Thomas Jones. His landscapes were acknowledged as an influence by Constable, John Crome and Turner.

Wilson died at Colomendy, Denbighshire on 15 May 1782, and is buried in the grounds of St Mary's Church, Mold, Flintshire.

Works

In 1948, Mary Woodall, keeper of art at Birmingham Museum and Art Gallery, organized a pioneer exhibition of his work.

Extant works include:
Landscapes
Caernarfon Castle
Cock Tavern at Cheam, at the Winnipeg Art Gallery
Dolbadarn Castle
Dover Castle
Lake Avernus with a Sarcophagus, at the Worcester Art Museum, Worcester, MA
Lydford Waterfall, Tavistock
River at Penegoes
The Garden of the Villa Madama, Rome
Valley of the Mawddach with Cader Idris
View at Tivoli
View in Windsor Great Park
Cilgerran Castle
Classical Landscape, Strada Nomentana
Conway Castle
Dolgellau Bridge
The Niagara Falls'Pistyll Rhaeadr, Aber FallsSolitude (or Landskip with Hermits)
OtherCeyx and Alcyone (1768)Francis Ayscough, Dean of Bristol and tutor to King George III of Great Britain with his pupilsMiss Catherine Jones of Colomendy, near Mold (1740)

References
References

Further reading
Postle, Martin and Robin Simon, Richard Wilson and the Transformation of European Landscape Painting, New Haven and London, 2014

Cole, Timothy. Old English masters (New York : The Century Co., 1902) pp. 67–76.
Fletcher, Beaumont. Richard Wilson. R.A. The Makers of British Art (Walter Scott, London, 1908).
Edwards, R. 'Richard Wilson and his pupil', in Country Life (1945 November)
Ford, B. The Drawings of Richard Wilson (1951)
Constable, W. G. Richard Wilson (1953)
Spencer-Longhurst, Paul. Richard Wilson: Online Catalogue Raisonné (London: Paul Mellon Centre, 2014).
Sutton, Denys & Clement, Ann. An Italian sketchbook: drawings made by the artist in Rome and its environs (Routledge & Kegan Paul, 1968).
Solkin, David H., Richard Wilson: The Landscape of Reaction (Tate Gallery, London, 1982).
Davies, John, Nigel Jenkins, Menna Baines and Peredur Lynch (Eds.). The Welsh Academy Encyclopaedia of Wales  (University of Wales Press, 2008). 
Wright, T., '''Some Account of The Life of Richard Wilson, Esq. RA, with testimonies to his genius and memory, and remarks on his landscapes,' (London: Longman, Hurst, Rees, Orme, Brown and Green, 1824).

External links

Works by Richard Wilson on Google Art Project (50 works)
Works by Richard Wilson on ArtCyclopedia
Richard Wilson entry in the Encyclopedia of Irish and World Art
The Mystery of the British Landscape Master, The New York Times, 4 June 2010
Museo virtuale della città di Tivoli Tivoli - Opere pittoriche su Tivoli
W.G. Constable archive

18th-century British painters
1714 births
1782 deaths
People from Montgomeryshire
Welsh landscape painters
Welsh male painters
Royal Academicians